Sir Gaëtan Duval Airport  is an airport located near Plaine Corail on Rodrigues, an island dependency of Mauritius. It is named after Gaëtan Duval (1930–1996), a former deputy Mauritian prime minister, who oversaw much of the development of Rodrigues. Prior to being renamed in 2007, it was known as Plaine Corail Airport. Airport of Rodrigues Ltd (ARL) was incorporated on 8 February 2000 as a public company.

In 2006, the airport handled 49,500 passengers. It has an asphalt runway which measures .  In addition to Air Mauritius service to Mauritius, Air Austral has started seasonal service to Reunion's Pierrefonds airport.

Airlines and destinations

References

External links

Airports in Mauritius
Buildings and structures in Rodrigues